Austroboletus is a genus of fungi in the family Boletaceae. The widely distributed genus contains 28 species that form mycorrhizal relationships with plants.

Taxonomy
E. J. H. Corner originally defined Austroboletus as a subgenus of Boletus in his 1972 work Boletus in Malaysia, before it  was raised to genus level in 1979 by mycologist Carl B. Wolfe. The type species is Austroboletus dictyotus, a fungus originally described by Karel Bernard Boedijn in 1960 as a member of the genus Porphyrellus. The generic name Austroboletus means "southern bolete".

In a 2014 molecular genetics study, Wu and colleagues defined 22 clades within the Boletaceae. They found the genus as understood to be polyphyletic – composed of two distinct lineages. One with pitted stipes, which remained as Austroboletus, while those with smoother stipes were moved to Veloporphyrellus.  They delineated a subfamily Austroboletoideae, which contained genera with pitted spores, including Austroboletus, Fistulinella, Mucilopilus and Veloporphyrellus. These genera were notable in the family in that their fruit bodies generally do not change colour when bruised.

Description
Although they resemble other boletes macroscopically, Austroboletus is differentiated microscopically with spores that are pitted, rather than smooth. The spore colour ranges from lilac- or pinkish-brown to wine-coloured. The pores and tubes are whitish. Members of the genus have a distinctive stipe marked by a coarse reticulate or lacunar (pitted) pattern—most prominent in species native to the western Pacific. The caps are usually dry when young, and sometimes sticky in maturity, with a surface texture ranging from smooth to tomentose to scaly. Microscopically, Austroboletus lacks clamp connections in the hyphae, and the presence of pleurocystidia and cheilocystidia (cystidia on the pore face and edge, respectively) is variable.

Habitat, distribution, and ecology
Members of the genus are found mainly in the tropics, as well as Australia, New Zealand, and New Caledonia in the southern hemisphere and Japan and North America in the Northern Hemisphere. Two species are found in North America: A. gracilis and A. subflavidus. The majority of Austroboletus species form mycorrhizal relationships with plant species.

Species
, Index Fungorum lists 27 valid species in Austroboletus.
A. amazonicus  A.M. Vasco-Pal. & C. López-Quint. (2014)
A. cornalinus (Perr.-Bertr. & R.Heim) E.Horak (1980)
A. dictyotus (Boedijn) Wolfe (1980)
A. eburneus Watling & N.M.Greg. (1986)
A. festivus (Singer) Wolfe (1980)
A. fusisporus (Kawam. ex Imazeki & Hongo) Wolfe (1980)
A. graciliaffinis Singer (1988)
Spores are elliptical (in face view) or fusiform (in profile view), with average dimensions of 16.7 by 7.7 µm.
A. gracilis (Peck) Wolfe (1980)
The pore surface is initially whitish, then later matures to pinkish or flesh-colored. The stipe is typically slim.
A. heterospermus (R.Heim & Perr.-Bertr.) Singer (1983)
A. lacunosus (Kuntze) T.W.May & A.E.Wood (1995)
A. latitubulosus E.Horak (1980)
A. longipes (Massee) Wolfe (1980)
A. malaccensis (Pat. & C.F.Baker) Wolfe (1980)
A. mucosus (Corner) Wolfe (1980)
A. mutabilis Halling, Osmundson & M.A. Neves (2006)
A. neotropicalis Singer, J.García & L.D.Gómez (1991)
A. occidentalis Watling & N.M.Greg. (1986)
A. olivaceoglutinosus K.Das & Dentinger (2015)
A. olivaceus Singer (1983)
Spores are elliptical (in face view) or fusiform (in profile view), with average dimensions of 12.9 by 5.9 µm.
A. purpurascens (Heinem.) E.Horak (1980)
A. rarus (Corner) E.Horak (1980)
A. rionegrensis (Singer & I.J.Araujo) Singer (1983)
A. rostrupii (Syd. & P.Syd.) E.Horak (1980)
A. rubiicolor (Corner) E.Horak (1980)
A. schichianus (Teng & L.Ling) E.Horak (1980)
A. subflavidus (Murrill) Wolfe (1980)
The cap color ranges from whitish to pale grayish yellow; the mushroom has a bitter taste.
A. subvirens (Hongo) Wolfe (1980)
A. trinitatensis Wolfe (1988)
A. tristis (Pat. & C.F.Baker) Wolfe (1980)

See also

 Heimioporus betula

References

External links

 
Boletales genera
Boletaceae